William Frederick Quesse (April 4, 1878 – February 16, 1927) was an American labor leader and president of the Building Service Employees International Union, the precursor of the Service Employees International Union, from 1921 to 1927. He was the union's founding president.

Early life
Quesse was born to German immigrants Christopher (or Christian) Quesse and Elsie Quesse (née Haake) in Chebanse, Illinois. They had ten children, only seven of whom survived to adulthood: Christian, Henry, Minnie, Dorothea, William (Bill), Emily, and George. He married the former Margaret Anna Pankau, and the couple had three children.

Quesse founded a union of 200 apartment janitors in 1902. The union quickly folded, however.  Undeterred, Quesse founded the Chicago Flat Janitor's Union in 1912. Quesse was elected president.

In 1921, Quesse led six other janitors' unions in Chicago in forming the Building Service Employees International Union (BSEIU). The new union immediately received a charter from the American Federation of Labor.

BSEIU and presidency
The union led a strike in 1917 which led to retention of contracts but little economic advancement.

A second labor dispute erupted in 1920. Initially, Quesse agreed to arbitration as a way of ending the wage impasse, but the arbitrator ruled for no pay increase. The union undertook a pressure campaign against the employers. The Employers' Association of Chicago initiated an anti-union campaign aimed at BSEIU, and not only resisted the union's organizing efforts but began an active public relations, legal, and media campaign to break the union. As the organizing drive continued throughout 1920 and 1921, both sides undertook a program of bombings, beatings, intimidation, extortion, and bribery.

A 1921 indictment resulted in a hung jury. In 1922, 10 union leaders, including Quesse, were indicted a second time on an array of charges, including extortion and conspiracy to bomb buildings.

On June 8, 1922, Quesse and the other BSEIU leadership were convicted of conspiracy and sentenced to one to five years in prison. In 1924, Quesse was pardoned by Republican Governor Len Small. Defenders of the convicts claim law enforcement officials ignored evidence of employer crimes after the employers' association pressured city officials to break the union and used the public relations campaign to whip up anti-union public sentiment. The employer organization's campaign against BSEIU continued, but the union's extensive political activity (Quesse had founded the Cook County Wage Earners' League to act as a political action committee for labor unions in the city) prior to the organizing drive had won it supporters in City Hall.  Quesse's ties to Republican Mayor William Hale Thompson helped protect the union.

The state again attempted to indict Quesse in 1924, but nothing came of the charges as Quesse's political backers helped quash the indictment.

Death
In the last three years of his life, Quesse built BSEIU into the most powerful labor union in Chicago.  His political influence grew not only throughout the city, but the state of Illinois as well.

Quesse fell ill with cancer in late 1926. In January 1927, he was hospitalized at Columbus Memorial Hospital. After his condition was recognized as terminal, he was allowed to return home on February 13. He died at 1:00 a.m. on the morning of February 16.

BSEIU successors
Quesse's close friend, Chicago City Alderman Oscar Nelson, who was at his side when he died, was named interim president of BSEIU.  Jerry Horan, a BSEIU organizer whose primary job was to act as Quesse's chauffeur, was elected Quesse's successor as BSEIU president on September 6, 1927. William McFetridge, Quesse's nephew, became president of BSEIU in 1940.

Notes

References
Beadling, Tom, et al. A Need for Valor: The Roots of the Service Employees International Union, 1902-1992. Washington, D.C.: Service Employees International Union, 1992.
"Bombed After Defying Quesse, Woman Charges." Chicago Daily Tribune. December 19, 1920.
"Bombs, 'Fines,' Laid to Janitor's Union Leaders." Chicago Daily Tribune. January 19, 1922.
Bukowski, Douglas. Big Bill Thompson, Chicago, and the Politics of Image. Urbana, Ill.: University of Illinois Press, 1998. 
"Chicago Janitors Guilty." New York Times. June 10, 1922.
"Confess Bribe to Fix Jury." Chicago Daily Tribune. March 23, 1922.
"Crowe Orders Charge Renewed Against Quesse." Chicago Daily Tribune. October 23, 1924.
"Death Notices." Chicago Daily Tribune. February 17, 1927.
Fitch, Robert. Solidarity For Sale. New York: PublicAffairs, 2006. 
"400 Janitors Vote to Go Out on Strike Today." Chicago Daily Tribune. January 17, 1917.
"Gambling Salon Operates Wide Open Near City Hall." Chicago Daily Tribune. April 19, 1928.*"Horan Installed As Head of Flat Janitor Union." Chicago Daily Tribune. September 7, 1927.
"Janitors Get No Pay Raise in Chief's Edict." Chicago Daily Tribune. December 28, 1920.
"Janitors Will Arbitrate." Chicago Daily Tribune. November 28, 1920.
Jentz, John B. "Unions, Cartels, and the Political Economy of American Cities: The Chicago Flat Janitors' Union in the Progressive Era and the 1920s." Studies in American Political Development. 14 (Spring 2000).
Jentz, John B. "Citizenship, Self-Respect, and Political Power: Chicago's Flat Janitors Trailblaze the Service Employees International Union, 1912-1921." Labor's Heritage. 9:1 (Summer 1997).
"Labor Finds Its Small Bosters Are Discredited." Chicago Daily Tribune. April 7, 1924.
"Labor's Day to Show Its Force." Chicago Daily Tribune. September 1, 1902.
"Quesse to Ask Small Pardon; Hearing Today." Chicago Daily Tribune. April 11, 1924.
"Second Flat Janitors' Trial Will Start Today." Chicago Daily Tribune. April 19, 1922.
"Vote Three Indictments." Chicago Daily Tribune. March 25, 1922.
"W.F. Quesse, Labor Chief, Dies of Cancer." Chicago Daily Tribune. February 16, 1927.
"W. L. M'Fetridge, Labor Leader, 75." New York Times. March 17, 1969.
Wendt, Lloyd, and Kogan, Herman. Big Bill of Chicago. Evanston, Ill.: Northwestern University Press, 2005. 
Witwer, David. "The Scandal of George Scalise: A Case Study in the Rise of Labor Racketeering in the 1930s." Journal of Social History. Summer 2003.

External links
SEIU Historical Records at the Walter P. Reuther Library at Wayne State University

Janitors
Presidents of the Service Employees International Union
1878 births
1927 deaths
Trade unionists from Illinois
American Federation of Labor people
Activists from Chicago
Recipients of American gubernatorial pardons